Gene W. Glenn (born November 13, 1928) was an American politician in the state of Iowa.

Glenn was born in Wapello County, Iowa. He attended Iowa State University and George Washington University and is a lawyer. He served in the Iowa State Senate from 1967 to 1979, and House of Representatives from 1965 to 1967, as a Democrat.

References

1928 births
Living people
People from Wapello County, Iowa
Iowa State University alumni
George Washington University Law School alumni
Democratic Party Iowa state senators
Democratic Party members of the Iowa House of Representatives